Yeo Yann Yann (born 20 February 1977) is a Malaysian actress. She has worked in theatre, television, and film. Her credits include Singapore Dreaming, Thunderstorm, 881, Ilo Ilo and Wet Season.

She is a pioneer-graduate of Intercultural Theatre Institute (ITI). Besides acting, Yeo also hosts bilingual events and performs for corporate skits and projects.

Career 
Yeo cites her acting mentor (the late theatre doyen Kuo Pao Kun) as a big part in her career.

Film 
Her role as Mei in the 2009 film, Singapore Dreaming garnered rave reviews for her performance.

The film won the Montblanc New Screenwriters Award at the 54th San Sebastian International Film Festival, and was the first Singaporean film to receive an IFFPA-recognised international feature film award.

Television
Rising to recognition through her role as Chen Mei Li in The Right Frequency, Yeo began to appear more frequently in television programmes since 2008. Notable performances include Food Goin' Bananas (2008) and The A-Go-Go Princess (2009). In 2009 also, she played the leading role in The Iron Lady, produced by ntv7.

Yeo has also been featured in the Singapore Speak Chinese campaign (华语cool!), in-character from her role in the Royston Tan film 881.

Personal life
Yeo is married to Hong Kong action choreographer Ma Yuk-sing. They have a daughter, Song Wen (Vera), born in August 2012.

Filmography

Feature film

Short film

Television series

Music video appearances

Other production

Theatre

Awards and nominations

References

External links

Yeo Yann Yann at chinesemov.com

Malaysian people of Hokkien descent
Malaysian people of Chinese descent
Living people
1977 births
People from Johor Bahru
21st-century Malaysian actresses
Malaysian television actresses
Malaysian film actresses
Malaysian stage actresses
Best Supporting Actress Asian Film Award winners